2786 km is a rural locality (a railway station) in Kulikovskoye Rural Settlement of Kalachinsky District, Russia. The population was 14 as of 2010.

Geography 
The village is located 1 km west-south-west from Kalachinsk.

Streets 
 Orlovskaya

References 

Rural localities in Omsk Oblast